Glenea venus is a species of beetle in the family Cerambycidae. It was described by James Thomson in 1865. It is known from Papua New Guinea, Australia and Indonesia.

Subspecies

 Glenea venus bilitonensis Breuning, 1956 (Biliton)
 Glenea venus celebensis Ritsema, 1892 (Sulawesi) 
 Glenea venus finschi Kuntzen, 1914 (Papua New Guinea, Australia)
 Glenea venus heinrothi Kuntzen, 1914 (Duke of York Islands, Woodlark Island, New Britain)
 Glenea venus venus Thomson, 1865 (West Papua, Moluccas)

References

venus
Beetles described in 1865